Joseph Currie Hanna (May 19, 1920 – July 26, 2003) was an American politician who served in the Texas House of Representatives from 1971 to 1985.

Biography
Hanna attended John Tarleton Agricultural College in 1940 and later transferred to University of Texas at Austin, studying Pre-law. He served as a fighter pilot in the United States Navy during World War II. He was elected to the Texas House of Representatives in 1984 and served a total of seven terms. Hanna died on July 26, 2003 in Breckenridge, Texas.

References

External links

|-

|-

1920 births
2003 deaths
Democratic Party members of the Texas House of Representatives
United States Navy personnel of World War II